Patrick Clifford may refer to:

 Patrick Clifford (musician) (born 1966), musician, songwriter, and producer of Irish and folk music
 Patrick Clifford (darts player), Irish darts player
 Patrick Clifford (politician) (1854–?), member of the Wisconsin State Assembly